Duchess Louise Charlotte of Mecklenburg-Schwerin (19 November 1779 – 4 January 1801) was the maternal grandmother of Prince Albert, husband of Queen Victoria of the United Kingdom.

Louise Charlotte was born Duchess of Mecklenburg-Schwerin, her father being Friedrich Franz I, Grand Duke of Mecklenburg-Schwerin. Her mother was Princess Louise of Saxe-Gotha-Altenburg; her sister Charlotte of Mecklenburg-Schwerin (1784–1840) married King Christian VIII of Denmark.

Life

On 1 November 1795, Louise Charlotte was engaged to King Gustav IV Adolf of Sweden. The engagement was arranged by Gustaf Adolf Reuterholm, the de facto regent of Sweden, who wished to keep his influence after the monarch was declared of legal majority by having a queen indebted to him for her position. The king himself was initially positive; the engagement was celebrated in the courts of Sweden and Mecklenburg and Louise Charlotte was mentioned in the official church prayer in Sweden. Empress Catherine the Great, however, wished her granddaughter Grand Duchess Alexandra Pavlovna of Russia to be Queen of Sweden, and displayed dislike of the engagement. Upon this many people told the king that Louise Charlotte, whom he had not seen, was not beautiful. About the same period, the monarch also fell in love with Ebba Modée. When the king was declared of legal majority in 1796, he broke off the engagement. Her father demanded compensation. In 1803, the matter was settled when the Swedish city of Wismar in Germany was turned over to Mecklenburg-Schwerin by a treaty in Malmö.

In Ludwigslust on 21 October 1797 she married Augustus, Hereditary Prince of Saxe-Gotha-Altenburg, a second cousin on her mother's side. Their common ancestor was Frederick II, Duke of Saxe-Gotha-Altenburg (1676–1732). The marriage was arranged against her will and was an unhappy one: her spouse abused her and she wished to leave him, but was forced by her family to stay. She was described as very blond, not attractive, somewhat hunchbacked but also as witty, talented, cultivated and with a pleasant manner, though more open than what was regarded as an ideal for the period.
  
Three years later, on 21 December 1800 in Friedenstein Castle around 12.45 pm the Hereditary Princess of Saxe-Gotha-Altenburg gave birth her only child, a daughter, named Louise after her; this daughter later became the wife of Ernst I, Duke of Saxe-Coburg and Gotha, and mother to Prince Albert, Prince consort of Queen Victoria. However, she never recovered from childbirth effects and died eleven days later, on 1 January 1801 at the age of 21, before Augustus assumed the throne of Saxe-Gotha-Altenburg.

Ancestry

References

External links
 "Hansastad blev svensk fästning" @ Populär Historia (in Swedish)
 "Gustav IV Adolf av Holstein-Gottorp" (in Swedish)
 "Lovisa Charlotta" from Anteckningar om svenska qvinnor @ Projekt Runeberg (in Swedish)

1779 births
1801 deaths
House of Saxe-Gotha-Altenburg
Princesses of Saxe-Gotha-Altenburg
House of Mecklenburg-Schwerin
People from Schwerin
Duchesses of Mecklenburg-Schwerin
Deaths in childbirth
Daughters of monarchs